

Royal New Zealand Navy bases and ships of the South Island
 - Multi Role Vessel: 2007-
 - Protector class inshore patrol vessel: 2007-
 - Protector Class Ocean Patrol Vessel: 2007-
, RNZNVR Establishment, Christchurch
 - Protector class inshore patrol vessel: 2008-
, RNZNVR Establishment, Dunedin

Former Royal New Zealand Navy bases, ships and units of the South Island
 - : 1971–2005
 - Military sealift ship: 1995–2000
 - : 1943–1947
 - : 1948–1957
 - Moa class patrol boat: 1984–2007
 - Examination vessel: 1942–1944
 - Moa class patrol boat: 1984–2007
 - armed merchant cruiser and Landing Ship, Infantry: 1940–1943
 - Hydrographic survey vessel: 1975–1997
 - : 1960–1983
 - : 1948–1966
 - : 1983–1997
 - Examination vessel: 1942–1944
 - Training vessel: 1944–1946
 - Former Naval Base at Lyttelton
 - Examination vessel: 1942–1944
 - : 1943–1946
 - Examination vessel: 1940–1944
3rd Minesweeping Group, Royal New Zealand Navy

Royal New Zealand Air Force bases and units of the South Island
RNZAF Air Movements Harewood, Christchurch
RNZAF Base Wigram, Christchurch
RNZAF Base Woodbourne
RNZAF Command Training School
RNZAF Dip Flat, Nelson Lakes District
RNZAF General Service Training School
RNZAF Museum, Wigram, Christchurch

Former Royal New Zealand Air Force bases and units of the South Island
RNZAF Addington
RNZAF Cashmere
RNZAF Darfield
RNZAF Dillions Point
RNZAF Eyreton (Harris Field)
RNZAF Hillside, Dunedin
RNZAF Lyttelton
RNZAF Maronan
RNZAF Mayfield
RNZAF Milton
RNZAF Momona
RNZAF Outram
RNZAF Station Ashburton
RNZAF Station Birdlings Flat
RNZAF Station Christchurch Central
RNZAF Station Delta
RNZAF Station Fairhall
RNZAF Station Harwood
RNZAF Station Norwood
RNZAF Station Nelson
RNZAF Station Omaka
RNZAF Station Taieri
RNZAF Station Te Pirita
RNZAF Station Weedons
RNZAF Waimakariri
No. 1 Electrical and Wireless School
No. 1 Elementary Flying Training School
No. 1 Flying Training School RNZAF
No. 1 Ground Training Depot
No. 1 Repair Depot
No. 1 Service Flying Training School RNZAF
No. 2 Aircraft Storage Unit
No. 2 Elementary Flying Training School
No. 2 Service Flying Training School
No. 2 Squadron RNZAF
No. 3 Anti-Aircraft Co-operation Flight
No. 3 Electrical and Wireless Training Squadron
No. 3 Elementary Flying Training School
No. 3 Repair Depot RNZAF
No. 3 Squadron RNZAF
No. 3 Stores Depot
No. 3 Technical Training School
No. 4 Squadron RNZAF
No. 4 Technical Training Centre
No. 10 Squadron RNZAF
No. 11 Squadron RNZAF
No. 12 Squadron RNZAF
No. 16 Squadron RNZAF
No. 18 Squadron RNZAF
No. 21 Squadron RNZAF
No. 22 Squadron RNZAF
No. 31 Squadron RNZAF
No. 32 Squadron RNZAF
No. 41 Squadron RNZAF
No. 43 Squadron RNZAF
311 Electrical and Wireless Squadron
Administrative Training School
Airframe Reconditioning Squadron RNZAF (RNZAF Base Woodbourne)
Navigation and Air Electronics Training Squadron RNZAF
Pilot Training Squadron RNZAF
RNZAF Advanced Ground Training Squadron
Central Flying School RNZAF (1945–1993)
Elementary Ground Training Squadron
RNZAF Ground Training Depot
RNZAF Initial Training Wing
RNZAF NCO's School
RNZAF Officers' School of Instruction
RNZAF School of General Reconnaissance
RNZAF Southern Group Headquarters

South Island bases and units of the New Zealand Army
 Burnham Army Camp
 Tekapo Army Training Area
 HQ 3 Land Force Group
 Queen Alexandra's Mounted Rifles, Royal New Zealand Armoured Corps - Reconnaissance Role (30 NZLAV)
 2nd/1st Battalion, Royal New Zealand Infantry Regiment (Light Infantry)
 2nd Canterbury, and Nelson-Marlborough and West Coast Battalion Group (Territorial Force)
 4th Otago and Southland Battalion Group (Territorial Force)
 3 Field Troop, 2 Engineer Regiment, Corps of Royal New Zealand Engineers
 3 Signals Squadron Royal New Zealand Corps of Signals
 3 Logistics Battalion, Royal New Zealand Army Logistic Regiment
 3 Military Police Platoon, Royal New Zealand Military Police
 Medical Treatment Centre, 2 Health Services Battalion, Royal New Zealand Army Medical Corps
 Army Adventure Training Centre
 3 Regional Training Unit
 Health Services School, 2 Health Services Battalion, Royal New Zealand Army Medical Corps
 New Zealand Army Band

Former South Island bases and units of the New Zealand Army
Historically the South Island has provided 1/3 of the New Zealand Army's strength.
 HQ Southern Military District, King Edward Barracks, Christchurch
 5th Division (New Zealand) (1942–1943)
 HQ 3 Infantry Brigade, King Edward Barracks, Christchurch
 Addington Barracks, Christchurch
 Canterbury and Nelson Military District Ordnance Depot, King Edwards Barracks, Christchurch, 1907 to 1921
 Canterbury Infantry Regiment, New Zealand Expeditionary Force, (1914–1919)
 Canterbury Mounted Rifle Regiment (1911–1921)
 Canterbury and Nelson Military District Stores Depot, King Edwards Barracks, Christchurch, (1907 to 1921)
 Canterbury Regiment (1921–1964)
 Canterbury Rifle Volunteers (1859–1866)
 Canterbury Yeomanry Cavalry (1921–1944)*
 Otago Districts Stores Depot, Defence Stores Department, St Andrews Street (1907 to 1921)
 Fort Arthur, Nelson
 King Edward Barracks, Christchurch
 Marlborough Rifle Volunteers (1861–1866)
 Nelson Battalion of Militia (1845)
 Nelson, Marlborough and West Coast Regiment (1923–1964)
 Nelson-Marlborough Mounted Rifles(1921–1944)
 Nelson Volunteer Rifles (1860–1901)
 Otago and Southland Regiment (1948–1964)
 Otago Mounted Rifle Regiment (1911–1921)
 Otago Mounted Rifles (1921–1944)
 Otago Regiment (1921–1948)
 Otago Infantry Regiment, New Zealand Expeditionary Force, (1914–1919)
 Southern Districts Ordnance Depot (1921 to 1968)
 Southland Regiment (1921–1948)
 1st (Canterbury) Regiment (1911–1921)
 1st Mounted Rifles (Canterbury Yeomanry Cavalry) (1911–1944)
 2nd Battalion (Canterbury, Nelson, Marlborough and West Coast), Royal New Zealand Infantry Regiment (1964–1999)
 2nd (South Canterbury) Regiment (1911–1921)
 3rd Armoured Regiment, Royal New Zealand Armoured Corps (1944–1956)
 3 Central Ordnance Deport(1968 to 1979)
 3 Field Ambulance, Royal New Zealand Army Medical Corps
 3rd Field Regiment Royal New Zealand Artillery (1940–1990)
 3 Field Squadron, Corps of Royal New Zealand Engineers
 3 Supply Company (1979 to 1993)
 3 Transport Squadron, Royal New Zealand Corps of Transport
 4th Battalion (Otago and Southland), Royal New Zealand Infantry Regiment (1964–1999)
 4th (Otago Rifles) Regiment (1911–1921)
 5th Mounted Rifles (Otago Hussars) (1911–1921)
 5th Light Regiment Royal Regiment of New Zealand Artillery (1956–1964)
 7th (Southland) Mounted Rifles (1911–1921)
 8th (South Canterbury) Mounted Rifles (1911–1921)
 8th (Southland Rifles) Regiment (1911–1921)
 10th (Nelson) Mounted Rifles (1911–1921)
 10th (North Otago Rifles) Regiment (1911–1921)
 11th Coast Regiment Royal Regiment of New Zealand Artillery
 12th (Nelson and Marlborough) Regiment (1911–1921)
 12th (Otago) Mounted Rifles (1911–1921)
 13th Coast Regiment Royal Regiment of New Zealand Artillery
 13th (North Canterbury and Westland) Regiment (1911–1921)
 14th (South Otago Rifles) Regiment (1911–1921)
 20th Armoured Regiment, 2nd New Zealand Expeditionary Force, (1939–1945)
 20th Battalion, 2nd New Zealand Expeditionary Force, (1939–1945)
 23rd Battalion, 2nd New Zealand Expeditionary Force, (1939–1945)
 26th Battalion, 2nd New Zealand Expeditionary Force, (1939–1945)
 30th Battalion, 2nd New Zealand Expeditionary Force, (1939–1945)
 37th Battalion, 2nd New Zealand Expeditionary Force, (1939–1945)

See also
Coastal fortifications of New Zealand

References

External links
 http://www.regiments.org
 https://www.webcitation.org/query?url=http://www.geocities.com/rnznhistory/nz_main.html&date=2009-10-25+21:18:58
 http://www.cambridgeairforce.org.nz/RNZAF%20Stations%20South%20Island.htm

Further reading
 

Military installations of New Zealand
Military units and formations of New Zealand